Nestor Alexander Haddaway (born 9 January 1965) is a Trinidadian-born German singer best known for his 1993 hit single "What Is Love", which reached number 1 in 13 countries.

Early life
Nestor Alexander Haddaway was born in Trinidad and Tobago in 1965. His mother was a nurse and his father was a marine biologist. His parents separated in the early 1970s and Haddaway first lived with his father in Europe, then with his mother in America. He was raised in Chicago and moved to the Washington, DC metropolitan area at the age of 9. Listening to Louis Armstrong encouraged Haddaway to learn how to play trumpet at the age of 14. He attended Meade Senior High School in Fort Meade, Maryland, where he was a member of the marching band, which eventually resulted in him forming his first group, Chances. In 1987, Haddaway enrolled in medical school, but dropped out due to lack of excitement and moved to Cologne, West Germany, where he mostly worked in bars. Later, he formed his own company called Energy, which was involved in organizing fashion shows and photo shoots.

Career

In 1992, Haddaway was signed by German label Coconut Records. His debut single, "What Is Love", rapidly became popular in Europe, reaching number 2 in Germany and the United Kingdom. In Germany, the single sold 900,000 copies. In the United Kingdom, it received a music recording certification of Gold for shipment of 400,000 units. It later reached number 11 on the Billboard Hot 100 and was certified Gold for shipments of 500,000 units. By the beginning of 1994, worldwide sales of "What Is Love" reached 2.6 million.

His second single, "Life", reached number 2 in Germany, number 6 in the United Kingdom, and number 41 in the US, and its worldwide sales reached 1.5 million by 1994. The follow-up singles "I Miss You" and "Rock My Heart" also reached the Top 10 in Europe and established him as a successful Eurodance artist. His first LP, The Album (also known as Haddaway in the US), was a multi-million seller which reached Platinum status in Germany for shipments of 500,000, and Gold in the UK and in France for shipments of 100,000.

In 1995, he released his second album, The Drive, which included the UK top 20 hit "Fly Away", as well as "Catch a Fire" and "Lover Be Thy Name". "What Is Love" enjoyed a resurgence in popularity as the theme music for the Butabi brothers (Will Ferrell and Chris Kattan) on Saturday Night Live and the 1998 film A Night at the Roxbury.

The albums Let's Do It Now (1998) and My Face (2001; re-released as Love Makes) all failed to chart.

Haddaway appeared on the television show Comeback – Die große Chance in Germany in 2004. He appeared on the UK version of Hit Me, Baby, One More Time in 2005 and subsequently appeared on the U.S. version. This exposure led to him scoring a moderate chart hit in Germany with the ballad "Spaceman" from his next album, Pop Splits.

In 2008, "What Is Love" was featured in a commercial for Diet Pepsi MAX that aired during Super Bowl XLII which parodied the leitmotif and included several stars including LL Cool J, Missy Elliott, and Busta Rhymes, but Haddaway himself did not appear in the ad.

In 2008, Haddaway teamed up with Eurodance star Dr. Alban for the single "I Love the 90's". In 2009, "What Is Love" re-entered charts after German DJ Klaas remixed it. The track resurfaced again in 2010 when it sampled heavily in Eminem's single "No Love" featuring Lil Wayne. In 2012, Haddaway released the single "Up and Up" with the Mad Stuntman, which was a top 20 dance hit in the US.

In 2011, he said that most of his performances are in "the east", in places such as Kazakhstan, Uzbekistan, or Siberia.

In 2016, he announced plans to star in Neverending Dream, a film about Eurodance. Despite launching a fundraiser on Indiegogo, the film was not released.

Personal life
Haddaway now lives in Kitzbühel, Austria, and also has a home in Cologne, Germany.

Since 2019 he has been a player and sponsor of the baseball team Kufstein Wolfins.   The team won the regional championships in 2019 and 2020.

Discography

Studio albums

Compilation albums

Singles

Notes

References

External links
 Official website Www.haddawaychannel.com

1965 births
20th-century German male singers
21st-century German male singers
Arista Records artists
Eurodance musicians
George Washington University alumni
German house musicians
Living people
Singers from Maryland
Musicians from Cologne
People from Kitzbühel
People from Port of Spain
20th-century Trinidad and Tobago male singers
20th-century Trinidad and Tobago singers
Trinidad and Tobago emigrants to Germany
Trinidad and Tobago expatriates in the United States
German expatriates in the United States
German expatriates in Austria